Bournemouth School for Girls is a grammar academy school located in Bournemouth, Dorset, England.
It is a girls grammar school and sixth form college, teaching girls aged 11 to 18.

History
Seventeen years after the boys school was founded this school opened with 160 pupils on 30 January 1918. The school moved to new buildings in Castle Gate Close in 1961.

Academics
Since September 2005, BSG has been a humanities specialist school. The school has approximately 1,100 students, including 300 in the sixth form. Until 2012, sixth form classes (including Theatre Studies, PE and Psychology) were open to Students at the boys-only Bournemouth School, with whom BSG share a sports and playing field.

The school is represented by a Senior Team led by the Head Girl and Deputy Head Girl and made up of six House and six Deputy House captains. Within each house there are designated positions for a sports prefect, performing arts prefect and a charities prefect.

House system
There are six forms per year group, denoted by their house initials. Prior to 2006 they were denoted using the number system and prior to 1997 they were denoted A, alpha, B, Beta, P and pi. In September 2006 the house system was reimplemented (it had existed when the school was located at the Landsdowne site, before moving to its current position on Castle Lane). The houses were named after influential women with assigned house colours, as follows: Jane Austen (red), Marie Curie (green), Rosalind Franklin (blue), Rosa Parks (yellow), Christina Rossetti (purple) and Mary Shelley (turquoise). The emblem of the school is a snowdrop, which features on all the house badges.

Productions
The school has an award-winning handbell team, who have played at the Royal Albert Hall. Every other year the school performs a musical which involves the whole school. In recent years these have been West Side Story, Les Misérables, Joseph and the Amazing Technicolour Dreamcoat, Little Shop of Horrors, The Sound of Music, and Grease and Hairspray. The girls also participate in Bournemouth School's productions such as Bugsy Malone, Jesus Christ Superstar, and in 2014, a musical written by sixth form students based upon Mary Shelley's Frankenstein. In the years where a musical is not performed, members of staff participate in a staff pantomime, with all proceeds going to charity.

Other extra curricular activities
Bournemouth School for Girls enters teams every year in the Mock Trial Competition, MACE debating, ESU public speaking, Rotary public speaking and Schools' Challenge competitions. There are also friendly debates fortnightly between BSG and BS, held in Bournemouth School's lecture theatre at lunchtime.  There is a lower school debating competition sponsored by local solicitors, HG Walker.  Also running are sports clubs for table tennis, a gym club, trampolining and ultimate frisbee; as well as Junior Drama club, History club, Science club, and various support clubs for students having difficulty with subjects. There is also now a comedy club, and in 2011, the Science club won a competition called "seeITgrow" run by the IT company Viglen, gaining first place in the tallest sunflower category for secondary schools with a height of 3 metres. A small group of students have also recently sent off their entry for Kid Witness News, an international documentary competition for schools.

Sport
Sports are an important part at Bournemouth School for Girls, which was recognised when in 2012, the school was selected by LloydsTSB to be a part of the National Olympic Torch Relay, in which 10 pupils carried an Olympic torch through Bournemouth.

CCF
The school has an active Combined Cadet Force, a rarity for a state-funded school. The CCF currently (when?) has over 150 members from both Bournemouth School and Bournemouth School for Girls.  The CCF is run by senior cadets and volunteer staff from both schools but hosted at Bournemouth School.  The CCF is open to pupils in year 9 (age 13) upwards with an annual recruitment usually in February. The CCF is split into three sections; Army, Navy and RAF, with each wearing rank-appropriate uniform.

Activities that cadets are able to take part in include gliding, flying, shooting, the Ten Tors walk, national exchanges and camps including Penhale central camp in the summer term. There is also a Band section that rehearses every week, also run by sixth form cadets, with each member choosing which uniform they wish to wear according to the section they want to be affiliated with.

Ofsted
Bournemouth School for Girls has won praise from Inspectors following their visits, achieving 'Outstanding' in all aspects of school life in 2012. Inspectors noted 'the very good teaching and good leadership at all levels that enable pupils to achieve very well and develop into confident young adults.'  They comment that 'staff are knowledgeable and supportive; they transfer their love of learning to the pupils and help them to achieve very well.'

Pupils at the school had 'their very high levels of determination to succeed' and 'exemplary behaviour'.  The sixth form was described as ‘highly effective'.  'Provision is very good in academic subjects and for students' personal development.'

Notable former pupils
 Lisa Dillon, actress
 Beth Kingston, actress
 Cherry Marshall (1923-2006), fashion model and agent, and non-fiction writer
 Tamaryn Payne, actress
 Pauline Rudd, Professor at University College Cork
 Sophie Rundle, actress
 Victoria Yeates, actress

References

External links

 Official website
 Bournemouth School CCF

Girls' schools in Dorset
Schools in Bournemouth
Grammar schools in Bournemouth, Christchurch and Poole
Academies in Bournemouth, Christchurch and Poole